Hale High School may refer to:

 Hale High School (Michigan), United States
 Hale High School (Missouri), United States
 Hale Center High School, Texas, United States
 Hale County High School, Alabama, United States
 Hale O Ulu School, Hawaii, United States
 St. David's School (Raleigh, North Carolina), United States (formerly known as Hale High School)

See also
 Nathan Hale High School (disambiguation)